The Internazionali di Monza E Brianza was a professional tennis tournament played on outdoor red clay courts from 2005 to 2012, held at the Circolo Tennis Monza in Monza, northern Italy. It was  part of the Association of Tennis Professionals (ATP) Challenger Tour.

Finals

Singles

Doubles

External links
Official website
ITF search 

ATP Challenger Tour
Clay court tennis tournaments
Internazionali di Monza E Brianza
Tennis tournaments in Italy